Tuberculosybra tuberculata is a species of beetle in the family Cerambycidae, and the only species in the genus Tuberculosybra. It was described by Breuning in 1948.

References

Apomecynini
Beetles described in 1948
Monotypic beetle genera